The 2017 NRL Under-20s season (known commercially as the 2017 Holden Cup due to sponsorship from Holden) was the tenth and final season of the National Rugby League's Under-20s competition.

The competition will start on 2 March. The finals will begin on 8 September and conclude with the final ever match of the competition, the Grand Final, which will be held on 1 October at ANZ Stadium. The Sydney Roosters are the defending champions.

The draw and structure of the competition largely mirror that of its first grade counterpart, the 2017 Telstra Premiership. However, the Melbourne Storm will play 10 of their 12 home fixtures at Sunshine Coast Stadium. Other matches will also be played at non-NRL venues, including Langlands Park, Belmore Sports Ground, Redfern Oval, Ringrose Park, Cudgen Leagues, Morry Breen Oval and Central Coast Stadium.

In 2018, the competition will be replaced by two competitions, one based in Queensland and one based in New South Wales.

Regular season

Bold – Opposition's Home game
X – Bye
* – Golden point game
Opponent for round listed above margin

Ladder

NYC Records

Ladder

Ladder Progression
Numbers highlighted in green indicate that the team finished the round inside the top 8.

Finals Series

Chart

Grand final

References